Serpophaga is a genus of birds in the tyrant flycatcher family Tyrannidae that are found in Central and South America.

The genus contains five species:

References

 Straneck, R. 2007. Una nueva especie de Serpophaga (Aves Tyrannidae). Revista FAVE - Ciencias Veterinarias 6 (1-2): 31–42.

 
Bird genera
Taxonomy articles created by Polbot